Julia Görges successfully defended her title, defeating Bianca Andreescu in the final, 2–6, 7–5, 6–1.

This was the first time since 2006 that no New Zealand player was in the main draw, with all three wildcards being given to Americans.

Seeds

Draw

Finals

Top half

Bottom half

Qualifying

Seeds

Qualifiers

Lucky loser
  Laura Siegemund

Qualifying draw

First qualifier

Second qualifier

Third qualifier

Fourth qualifier

References

External Links
 Main draw
 Qualifying draw

ASB Classic – Singles
Women's Singles 2019